PSV may refer to:

 Partial specific volume
 PlayStation Vita, a handheld game console produced by Sony Computer Entertainment
 Petit Saint Vincent, an island south of St. Vincent in the Grenadine islands
 Platform supply vessel, a specific type of ship 
 Police Support Volunteer, the rank of a volunteer performing civilian and usually office based work for British Police Forces
 Pressure safety valve
 Pressure Support Ventilation, a form of pressure cycled ventilation that gives a patient a set pressure of air at every breath initialization but has no respiratory rate set
 PSV Eindhoven, a football club from Eindhoven, Netherlands
 PSV (women), a women's football team representing PSV Eindhoven in the Eredivisie Vrouwen
 PSV Nickerie, a football club from Nieuw Nickerie, Suriname
 Public service vehicle, a bus